Crabtree is a rural residential locality in the local government area of Huon Valley in the South-east region of Tasmania. The 2016 census has a population of 292 for the state suburb of Crabtree.

History
Crabtree was gazetted as a locality in 1970. The name has been in use since 1874.

Geography
Mountain River (the watercourse) forms a part of the south-eastern boundary. Crabtree Rivulet rises in the north-west and flows through the locality to the south-east, where it empties into Mountain River.

Road infrastructure
The C618 route (Crabtree Road) enters from the south-east and runs north-west for a short distance before it ends. Crabtree Road continues north-west with no route number. Route C645 (Cross Road) starts at an intersection with C618 and runs south-west until it exits.

References

Localities of Huon Valley Council
Towns in Tasmania